Club Deportivo Guabirá is a Bolivian professional football club from Montero, Santa Cruz, that currently plays in the Bolivian Primera División. Their home ground is the Estadio Gilberto Parada, which has a capacity of 18,000 spectators.

Although the team has always been based in Montero, they played in Santa Cruz de la Sierra until 1999 when their stadium was finally brought up to first division standards.

History 
The club was formed on 14 April 1962. Guabirá won its first trophy with the 1975 league title. The championship also gave the club a spot in their first continental participation: the 1976 Copa Libertadores, where it finished last in its group. The next year, in 1977, the club was one of the 16 clubs that founded the Bolivian professional league. In 1995 the club finished runner-up, which granted it a spot in the 1996 Copa Libertadores. The club finished last in the group again, although it got a victory over fellow Bolivian side Club San José.

The club almost won the Copa Bolivia in 2000, but lost to The Strongest in the final.

The club earned its first Copa Sudamericana participation and made the return to continental tournaments after 22 years with its participation in the 2018 Copa Sudamericana, where the club was eliminated in the first round on away goals to LDU Quito. They earned this right because they finished 6th in the aggregate table for the 2016–17 season. Guabirá participated again in the 2019 and 2021 editions. In 2019 they were eliminated in the first round to an Ecuadorian team again, this time to Macará, while in 2021 they defeated fellow Bolivian side Nacional Potosí to advance to the group stage, in which they lost all of their matches.

Honours
First Division – Professional Era
Winners (1): 1975
Runners-up (1): 1995
Second Division/ Copa Simón Bolivar
Winners (2): 2007, 2009
Runners-up (2): 1991, 2005
Copa Aerosur del Sur
Winners (1): 2010
Copa Bolivia
Runners-up (3): 1978, 1982, 2000

Performance in CONMEBOL competitions
Copa Libertadores: 2 appearances
Best: First Round in 1976, 1996
1976 – First Round
1996 – First Round

Copa Sudamericana: 3 appearances
Best: Group Stage in 2021
2018 – First stage
2019 – First stage
2021 – Group Stage

Current squad

References

External links
Club website

Football clubs in Bolivia
Association football clubs established in 1962
1962 establishments in Bolivia